Dick Gilbert (1878 - 1945) was a rugby union international who represented England in 1908.

Early life
Richard James Taylor (Dick) Gilbert was born on 28 August 1878 in Dartmouth.

Rugby union career
Gilbert made his international debut on 18 January 1908 at Bristol in the England vs Wales match. Of the three matches he played for his national side he was on the winning side only once.

References

1878 births
1945 deaths
English rugby union players
England international rugby union players
Rugby union forwards
Rugby union players from Dartmouth